Chatton is a locality in the eastern Southland region of New Zealand's South Island.

Chatton is part of the wider Waikaka statistical area.

References 

Populated places in Southland, New Zealand